Mildred Annie Trent (1883–1942) was a notable New Zealand cook, tearooms manager and community worker. She was born in Christchurch, North Canterbury, New Zealand in 1883.

Her first book, Stevens' "Cathedral Brand" essences cookery book, was published in 1920 by the manufacturer of the essences, H. F. Stevens. It was used as a giveaway to promote the essences.  In 1924 The Up-to-date Cook's Book was published by Gordon & Gotch. A second and revised edition was published in 1928.

References

1883 births
1942 deaths
People from Christchurch